Karin Katherine Taylor (born November 28, 1971) is a former international fashion model, known as Playboy magazine's June 1996 Playmate of the Month.

Career
Taylor was born in Kingston, Jamaica and began her modeling career at age 17, when she was discovered by the Ford Modeling agency in Miami. During her ten-year modeling career, she was represented around the world by such agencies as Wilhelmina Models NYC, Agence Unique (Greece), ICE Model Management (South Africa) and David and Lee Models Chicago.  She first appeared on television in 1992 as a Spokesmodel Contestant on Ed McMahon's Star Search, which began filming in Orlando that year.

In 1996, Taylor was selected as the Miss June Playmate of the Month in Playboy magazine. As other Playmates have done, she went on to appear in various Playboy videos from 1996 until 2001. After her appearance in Playboy, Taylor moved to Los Angeles and began an acting career that included a guest-starring appearance on Baywatch as Taylor Johnson, as well as roles and appearances on: Malcolm and Eddie, Weird Al Show, Keenen Ivory Wayans Show, Horace Brown's music video, "Things We Do for Love" (Brett Ratner, director) and  guest hosting on E!

In 1994, Snap-on tools discontinued their popular calendar, making Taylor the last official Snap-on calendar girl (November/December 1994) as reported by the Wall Street Journal.

Taylor briefly returned to her modeling roots and walked the runway one last time, for New York fashion designer Betsey Johnson, in her Spring 2001 collection, which was later made into a documentary.

Taylor is owner of Mandalay Farms, a 20-acre equestrian farm and exotic animal facility specializing in educational programs, animal therapy and private animal encounters.

Personal life
Karin Katherine Taylor was born on November 28, 1971 in Kingston, Jamaica. Taylor and her family moved to Orlando, Florida when she was a child.  Growing up in Orlando, Taylor was the quintessential "girl next door" who attended a Catholic school and was "an altar server the first year the Pope declared girls could serve". She worked as a lifeguard at the Wet n Wild Water park before entering the entertainment industry as a dancer for Walt Disney World in the Main Street Electrical Parade (1989–1990).

Taylor is a mother of five, and is living in Florida. Taylor writes a blog called the Trophy Mom Diaries where she posts about her life and various issues as the mother of young children and "the 2nd wife to a man 15 years older than me ".

See also
 List of people in Playboy 1990–1999

References

External links
 
 
 

1990s Playboy Playmates
Jamaican expatriates in the United States
Jamaican female models
1971 births
Living people
Jamaican people of Chinese descent
People from Kingston, Jamaica
American female models
21st-century American women